William Lincoln may refer to:

 William S. Lincoln (1813–1893), U.S. Representative from New York
 William Wallace Lincoln (1850–1862), son of Abraham Lincoln
 J. William Lincoln (born 1940), Pennsylvania politician
 W. J. Lincoln (1870–1917), Australian dramatist and filmmaker
 William Lincoln, a perpetrator of the 2015 Hatton Garden safe deposit burglary